Broadway Arizona is a 1917 American silent Western film directed by Lynn Reynolds and starring Olive Thomas, George Chesebro and George Hernandez.

Cast
 Olive Thomas as Fritzi Carlyle
 George Chesebro as John Keys
 George Hernandez as Uncle Isaac Horn
 Jack Curtis as Jack Boggs
 Dana Ong as Press Agent
 Tom Guise as Old Producer
 Neola May as Indian Squaw
 Robert Dunbar as Doctor

References

External links
 

1917 films
1917 Western (genre) films
American black-and-white films
Films directed by Lynn Reynolds
Silent American Western (genre) films
Triangle Film Corporation films
1910s English-language films
1910s American films